César Alejandro González Ramírez (born 11 January 1997) is a Chilean footballer that currently plays for Primera B de Chile club Deportes Santa Cruz as a forward.

Career

Youth career

González started his career at Primera División de Chile club O'Higgins. He progressed from the under categories club all the way to the senior team.

O'Higgins

On 1 February 2015, Cubillos debuted against Huachipato replacing Damián Lizio at the 75' on the 3–0 win at the Estadio El Teniente.

Career statistics

Club

References

External links
 González at Football Lineups
 

1997 births
Living people
Chilean footballers
Chilean Primera División players
O'Higgins F.C. footballers
Association football forwards